× Sophrocattleya (from Cattleya and Sophronitis, its parent genera) is an intergeneric hybrid of orchids. The genus is abbreviated Sc. in the horticultural trade.

References

Orchid nothogenera
Laeliinae
Historically recognized angiosperm taxa